Villeneuve is a commune in the Alpes-de-Haute-Provence department in southeastern France.

Villeneuve is located in Durance valley. This village, like many other villages in Provence, is built on the top of a hill to keep it protected from invaders. Villeneuve in French mean "New town" but was constructed in Middle Ages, originally further in the forest on the top of a high cliff. Only the little chapel remains on the rock to show where the original village was located.

Population

See also
 Coteaux de Pierrevert AOC
 Luberon

References

Communes of Alpes-de-Haute-Provence
Alpes-de-Haute-Provence communes articles needing translation from French Wikipedia